The Meanest Man in the World is a 1923 American silent comedy film. Directed by Edward F. Cline, the film stars Bert Lytell, Blanche Sweet, and Bryant Washburn. It was released on October 22, 1923. As of 2023, this film is considered lost.

Cast list
 Bert Lytell as Richard Clark
 Blanche Sweet as Jane Hudson
 Bryant Washburn as Ned Stevens
 Maryon Aye as Nellie Clarke
 Lincoln Stedman as Bart Nash, the office boy
 Helen Lynch as Kitty Crockett, the stenographer
 Ward Crane as Carleton Childs
 Frances Raymond as Mrs. Clarke
 Carl Stockdale as Hiram Leeds
 Tom Murray as Andy Oatman

References

American silent feature films
Lost American films
First National Pictures films
American black-and-white films
Silent American comedy films
1923 comedy films
1923 films
1920s English-language films
1923 lost films
Lost comedy films
1920s American films